Ramchandra Gandhi (9 June 1937 – 13 June 2007) was an Indian philosopher. 
He was the son of Devdas Gandhi (Mahatma Gandhi's youngest son) and Lakshmi (daughter of Rajaji) and also brother of Rajmohan Gandhi, Gopalkrishna Gandhi and Tara Gandhi Bhattacharjee.

Ramchandra Gandhi obtained his doctoral degree in philosophy from Oxford where he was a student of Peter Strawson. He is known for founding the philosophy department at the University of Hyderabad. He also taught at Visva-Bharati University, Panjab University, California Institute of Integral Studies in San Francisco, California, and Bangalore University. He died at the India International Centre on 13 June 2007, four days after his 70th birthday.

His daughter, Leela Gandhi, is a postcolonial academic at Brown University.

Bibliography
The Availability of Religious Ideas (1976)
Sita's Kitchen, a Testimony of Faith and Inquiry (1992)
Svaraj: A Journey with Tyeb Mehta's Shantiniketan Triptych (2003)
Muniya's Light (2005)

References

Ramchandra
1937 births
2007 deaths
20th-century Indian philosophers
Indian male writers
Academic staff of Visva-Bharati University
Bangalore University alumni